Tom McCartin (born 30 December 1999) is a professional Australian rules footballer playing for the Sydney Swans in the Australian Football League (AFL). He is a key defender. He made his debut in round 8 of the 2018 season against  at the Melbourne Cricket Ground (MCG).

McCartin originally played in the TAC Cup for the Geelong Falcons, but has also played three games in the AFL Under 18 Championships for Vic Country. He missed the whole of the 2016 season due to viral arthritis. At the AFL Draft Combine, he recorded  in the running vertical leap and level 21.5 in the yo-yo test. McCartin was drafted with pick 33 in the 2017 draft while completing Year 11 at St Joseph's College, Geelong, but decided not to complete Year 12. He was the youngest player on an AFL list in round 1, 2018 at 18 years and 82 days. Sydney coach John Longmire praised McCartin for his work rate during his first preseason.

Tom is the brother of former St Kilda player Paddy McCartin. The brothers played against each other for the first time in round 12, 2018 at Docklands Stadium. Sydney won by 71 points and both brothers kicked a goal. In September 2018, McCartin extended his contract by two years, tying him to Sydney until 2021. He played 15 games in his debut season as a key-position forward after Sam Reid was kept out with injuries. Football manager Tom Harley commented, "For an 18-year-old to hold down a key-position post for more than half the season in his debut year is an unbelievable achievement."

Statistics
Updated to the end of the 2022 season.

|-
| 2018 ||  || 30
| 15 || 8 || 6 || 69 || 65 || 134 || 50 || 32 || 0.5 || 0.4 || 4.6 || 4.3 || 8.9 || 3.3 || 2.1 || 0
|-
| 2019 ||  || 30
| 19 || 11 || 10 || 127 || 64 || 191 || 79 || 28 || 0.6 || 0.5 || 6.7 || 3.4 || 10.1 || 4.2 || 1.5 || 0
|-
| 2020 ||  || 30
| 14 || 9 || 2 || 70 || 49 || 119 || 51 || 12 || 0.6 || 0.1 || 5.0 || 3.5 || 8.5 || 3.6 || 0.9 || 0
|-
| 2021 ||  || 30
| 22 || 0 || 0 || 196 || 101 || 297 || 111 || 23 || 0.0 || 0.0 || 8.9 || 4.6 || 13.5 || 5.0 || 1.0 || 0
|-
| 2022 ||  || 30
| 25 || 0 || 0 || 137 || 107 || 244 || 96 || 38 || 0.0 || 0.0 || 5.5 || 4.3 || 9.8 || 3.8 || 1.5 || 2
|- class=sortbottom
! colspan=3 | Career
! 95 !! 28 !! 18 !! 599 !! 386 !! 985 !! 387 !! 133 !! 0.3 !! 0.2 !! 6.3 !! 4.1 !! 10.4 !! 4.1 !! 1.4 !! 2
|}

References

External links 

Australian rules footballers from Geelong
Living people
1999 births
Sydney Swans players
Geelong Falcons players
Australian rules footballers from Victoria (Australia)